Morro da Fumaça is a Brazilian municipality in the state of Santa Catarina. Its population was estimated at 17,947 inhabitants in 2020.

References

Municipalities in Santa Catarina (state)